Nicholas Mynheer (born 1958) is a British glass artist, painter and sculptor. His work is often biblically based, displaying traditional Christian iconography in modern form.

Life and work 
Mynheer studied Graphic Design at Hornsey College of Art in London, and worked in advertising. After his conversion to Christianity and influenced by his wife, he turned to religious art. His work was exhibited in Norwich Cathedral (Stations of the Cross, 2017), and can be found in Abingdon School, Birmingham, Lynford, Enstone, and elsewhere. His window in Southwell Minster commemorates the sacrifices made by men and women, at the front and at home, during World War I.

Selected works

References

External links 
 
 Victoria Emily Jones: Wilcote Altarpiece by Nicholas Mynheer. In: Ant & Theology, 27 Jan. 2016

Stained glass artists and manufacturers
British glass artists
20th-century British sculptors
1958 births
Living people
Religious artists
Converts to Christianity
Christian artists
English Christians